Dara Joy Maclean (born May 20, 1986) is an American contemporary Christian singer and songwriter born in Miami, Florida, but raised in Fort Worth, Texas, ever since she was eight years old. On July 12, 2011 Maclean released the album entitled You Got My Attention, her first full-length studio album.

Early and personal life 
Dara Joy Maclean, now Petty, was born in Miami, Florida, on May 20, 1986, to Dan and Judith Maclean, while Maclean has an older sister, Nicole. She eventually moved to Fort Worth, Texas, when she was eight years old. Maclean started singing at the age of eight, and led worship services at her church in her teens.  In addition, Maclean started to play the guitar and write songs at the age of 13.

Maclean is of Italian heritage; her grandfather changed the family name from Martorella to Maclean. Maclean announced via Twitter, January 8, 2013, that she was engaged to Donnie Petty. They were married on May 11, 2013.

Discography

Albums

Singles

References

External links 
 

1986 births
American women singer-songwriters
American people of Italian descent
American performers of Christian music
Fervent Records artists
Living people
People from Fort Worth, Texas
Singer-songwriters from Texas
Musicians from Miami
Singer-songwriters from Florida
21st-century American singers
21st-century American women singers